The Cuyamaca Mountains (Kumeyaay: ‘Ekwiiyemak), locally the Cuyamacas, are a mountain range of the Peninsular Ranges System, in San Diego County, southern California. The mountain range runs roughly northwest to southeast. The Laguna Mountains are directly adjacent to the east, with Palomar Mountain and Hot Springs Mountain more distant to the north.

Most of the range consists of extensive oak forest and chaparral, part of the California montane chaparral and woodlands ecoregion, interspersed with pine forests and lush riparian zones, featuring year round creeks and waterfalls. The San Diego River and Sweetwater River both have their headwaters in these mountains, which flow over 50 miles to the ocean. The pine forests were extensively burned by the 2003 Cedar Fire, along with many large areas of chaparral and oak woodland, which has since experienced slow and steady regrowth.

The high elevation results in snowfall throughout the winter months.

Geography
The San Diego River and the Sweetwater River both have headwaters in the Cuyamacas. The Cuyamaca Reservoir lies adjacent to the east side of the range.

Mountains are primarily protected within the Cleveland National Forest. Cuyamaca Rancho State Park, with California oak woodlands habitat, is located in the range.

The former mining town of Julian is in the northern section, and the towns of Descanso, Pine Valley and Guatay is in the southern. Alpine, a more populated town with some dense residential development, lies directly to the west of the range, bordering the Lakeside and El Cajon areas.

Interstate 8 passes through the southern part of the Cuyamaca Mountains. California State Route 79, known as the Cuyamaca Highway, runs north–south along the eastern part of the mountains.

Gold rush
Gold was discovered in the Cuyamacas in 1870 and the mountains were subject to a gold rush. Towns and encampments of Coleman City, Branson City, Eastwood, Julian, and Banner sprang up to support the miners. First there was a mining camp called Stonewall (1873–1876), then the company town of Stratton (1887–1888), renamed Cuyamaca City (1888–1906), had a peak population of 500 and served the Stonewall Mine. The town was abandoned after mining operations ceased, and few traces of it exist. The site of the town now lies within Cuyamaca Rancho State Park. Other gold mines were supported by the town of Julian, which celebrates its mining history with an annual festival called Gold Rush Days. The Eagle-High Peak Mine, no longer productive, is now a museum and gives daily tours.

Attractions 
A variety of recreational activities are available in the Cuyamaca Mountains. Lake Cuyamaca offers camping grounds for tents as well as areas to park motorhomes. The lake itself offers fishing and boating. There are also trails throughout the range that support hiking, biking, and horseback riding. The town of Julian is on the north end of the range, and it offers its share of events and 19th century history. Nearby Julian is California Wolf Center, which is a conservation, education, and research center dedicated to wolf recovery in the wild.

See also
California chaparral and woodlands
California mixed evergreen forest
California montane chaparral and woodlands

References

External links

 
Peninsular Ranges
Mountain ranges of San Diego County, California
Cleveland National Forest
East County (San Diego County)
Mountain Empire (San Diego County)
Kumeyaay
Mountain ranges of Southern California